Oligochaetocystinae is a subfamily of parasites in the phylum Apicomplexa.

Taxonomy
There are four genera in this subfamily: 
 Acarogregarina
 Echiurocystis
 Neomonocystis
 Oligochaetocystis

Description
The oocysts are cylindrical without thickening at ends.

References

Bikont subfamilies
Conoidasida